CDP.pl Sp. z o.o. is a Polish publisher and video game, film, e-book, and audiobook distributor founded in 2012. In January 2015, the company was expanded to include paper books, music, consoles, computer hardware, as well as tabletop, card, and figure games.

References

External links 
 

Companies based in Warsaw
Companies established in 2012
Video game publishers
2012 establishments in Poland